Events from the year 1651 in Denmark.

Incumbents 

 Monarch – Frederick III
 Steward of the Realm – Corfitz Ulfeldt (until July), Joachim Gersdorff

Events 
 11 July – The dispute between Corfitz Ulfeldt and Dina Winhofers culminates with the latter's execution. Ulfeldt and his family secretly leave Copenhagen on 4 July.

Undated 
 The House of the Holy Ghost in Copenhagen is turned over to the Church of the Holy Ghost.
 Kunstkammeret ("Royal Art Cabinet") is mentioned for the first time.
 Plague rages in Denmark.

Births

Deaths

References 

 
Denmark
Years of the 17th century in Denmark